Carina Fujisaki (née Carina Faris) is a Japanese-American actress and model, born January 20, 1997, in Tokyo, Japan. She is employed by a Japanese modeling agency and has done runway modeling, dramas, and a variety of photo shoots.

History
Carina Fujisaki was born and raised in the city of Tokyo, Japan. She eventually moved to San Francisco, California for her high school years and attended El Camino High School in South San Francisco, California.

Personal life
Carina is fluent in both Japanese and English. She can read and write in Japanese (Kana) and English.

References

External links
 Official Instagram  (archived)

1997 births
Living people
Japanese female models
Actresses from Tokyo
21st-century Japanese actresses